Iwata Station is the name of two train stations in Japan:

 Iwata Station (Shizuoka) (磐田駅)
 Iwata Station (Yamaguchi) (岩田駅)